James Warren McCleary (c. 1923 – 8 February 2012) was a Northern Irish footballer who played as a centre half.

Career
Born in Hillsborough, County Down, McCleary played as an amateur for Glentoran and Cliftonville whilst also working as a French teacher. He also earned one cap for the Northern Ireland national team and fifteen caps for the Northern Ireland national amateur team.

References

1920s births
2012 deaths
Association footballers from Northern Ireland
Northern Ireland international footballers
Glentoran F.C. players
Cliftonville F.C. players
NIFL Premiership players
Association football defenders